{{Infobox football biography
|        name = Zoltán Kovács
|             image = Kovács Zoltán UTE.JPG
|       birth_date = 
| birth_place = Budapest, Hungary
|            height = 179 cm
|          position = Striker Sports Director (Újpest FC)
| youthyears1 =
| youthclubs1 =   Nagytétényi Kohász, MTK
|  years1 =   1992–1994
| years2 =  1994–1995
| years3 =  1996
| years4 =  1996–1998
| years5 =  1998
| years6 =  1998–2000
| years7 =  2000–2002
| years8 =  2002–2004
| years9 =  2004
| years10 =  2004–2008
| years11 =  2008
|  clubs1 =   MTK Hungária FC
| clubs2 =  BVSC Budapest
| clubs3 =  Pécsi MFC
| clubs4 =  Újpest FC
| clubs5 =  PAOK FC
| clubs6 =  Újpest FC
| clubs7 =  LB Châteauroux
| clubs8 =  Újpest FC
| clubs9 =  Shenzhen Jianlibao
| clubs10 =  Újpest FC
| clubs11 =  Győri ETO FC
| clubs12 =  Career Total
| caps1 =             28
| caps2 =   33
| caps3 =   11
| caps4 =   49
| caps5 =   12
| caps6 =   59
| caps7 =   62
| caps8 =   44
| caps9 =   10
| caps10 =   97
| caps11 =   14
| caps12 =  428| goals1 =  6
| goals2 =  5
| goals3 =  5
| goals4 =  24
| goals5 =  5
| goals6 =  21
| goals7 =  14
| goals8 =  23
| goals9 =  3
| goals10 =  32
| goals11 =  4
| goals12 =  145
| nationalyears1 =     1997–2005
| nationalteam1 =   Hungary
| nationalcaps1 =     20
| nationalgoals1 =   2
}}Zoltán Kovács''' (born 24 September 1973) is a retired Hungarian footballer who used to play as a striker.
Kovács was the captain, and fan's favourite for Újpest. In 2008 Christmas Kovács retired from the professional football, although he continues his career in his youth club, Nagytétény in amateur level (fourth tier).

International goals

Honours
 Nemzeti Bajnokság I Runners-up: 1997, 2006
 Nemzeti Bajnokság I Third place: 1999
 Chinese Super League Champions: 2004
 CSL Cup Runner-up: 2004

References

1973 births
Living people
Hungarian footballers
Association football forwards
MTK Budapest FC players
Budapesti VSC footballers
Pécsi MFC players
Újpest FC players
LB Châteauroux players
Shenzhen F.C. players
Győri ETO FC players
Nemzeti Bajnokság I players
Super League Greece players
Ligue 2 players
Chinese Super League players
Hungary international footballers
Hungarian expatriate footballers
Hungarian expatriate sportspeople in Greece
Hungarian expatriate sportspeople in France
Hungarian expatriate sportspeople in China
Expatriate footballers in Greece
Expatriate footballers in France
Expatriate footballers in China
Footballers from Budapest